The 1924 New Mexico gubernatorial election was held on November 4, 1924.

Incumbent Democratic Governor James F. Hinkle did not run for a second term. Democratic nominee Arthur T. Hannett defeated Republican nominee Manuel B. Otero with 48.82% of the vote.

General election

Candidates
Arthur T. Hannett, Democratic, member of the State Highway Commission
Manuel B. Otero, Republican

Results

References

Bibliography
 
 

1924
New Mexico
Gubernatorial
November 1924 events